Summerville is a rural community in Kings County, New Brunswick, Canada. It is served by the Summerville to Millidgeville Ferry, which connects it with the neighbourhood of Millidgeville in Saint John.

History

Notable people
Emmett Hickey

See also
List of communities in New Brunswick

References 

Communities in Kings County, New Brunswick